Jagdish Chand Anand better known as J.C. Anand (1922 – 17 May 1977) was a Pakistani film producer and distributor. One of the largest distributors within the country, he founded Eveready Pictures in Karachi.

Background
Anand was born in 1922 in Bhera, Sargodha District, British India. His father was a businessman. His family opted to stay back in Pakistan at the time of Partition in 1947. Anand was the Uncle of Juhi Chawla (Indian actress) as she was his sister's daughter. 

His son, Satish Chand Anand continues to make films in Pakistan under their home banner Eveready Pictures.

Career
Soon after independence in 1947, Anand founded Eveready Pictures to produce and distribute films. Pakistan's pioneer film producer Agha G. A. Gul was his colleague and a friend. Film producer J. C. Anand played a key role in inviting Indian film maker Roop K. Shorey and his then popular actress wife Meena Shorey to Pakistan to make Miss 56 (1956 film). Meena Shorey was born in Raiwind, Punjab near Lahore and had become famously known as the Larra Lappa girl after the success of Indian film Ek Thi Ladki (1949).

Death
J.C. Anand died on 17 May 1977 in Karachi, Pakistan.

Films
 Sassi (1954) (first golden jubilee film of Pakistan) 
 Heer (1955) (with highly popular music and film songs by music director Safdar Hussain)
 Miss 56 (1956)
 Ishq-e-Laila (1957)
 Murad (1957)
 Noor-e-Islam (1957) (with super-hit Naat song ''Shah-e-Madina Yasrab Ke Waali')
 Hasrat (1958) 
 Alam Ara (1959)
 Dulhan (1963)

References

External links
 IMDb Profile of J.C. Anand
 Eveready Group of Companies

Pakistani Hindus
1922 births
1977 deaths
Pakistani film producers
Film distributors (people)